Rai Bahadur Jaladhar Sen (13 March 1860 – 15 March 1939) was a Bengali writer, poet, editor and also a philanthropist, traveler, social worker, educationist and littérateur. He was awarded with the title Ray Bahadur (রায় বাহাদুর) by the British Government.

Education and personal life
Jaladhar Sen was born in the Kumarkhali village of Nadia District (presently known as Kusthia district of Bangladesh) in a Dakshin-Rarhiya Kayastha family. His family originally hailed from Deganga , North 24 Parganas District of present-day West Bengal (India). His great-grandfather migrated to Kumarkhali to work as a Diwan under the East India Company. They were known as "Degangar Sen" (Sens of Deganga). His father, Sri Haladhar Sen, was an eminent person of the society. His father died when Jaladhar was only three years old. He appeared in the Minor Examination in 1871 from Goalanda Bengali school and received scholarship. In 1878 Jaladhar passed Entrance Examination from Kumarkhali English High School, and got admission to the General Assembly Institution in Calcutta in First Arts (FA) course. Though his formal education could not progress further, he continued self study and became an eminent littérateur of Bengal Reinsurance period. In 1883 Jaladhar joined Goalanda High School in Rajabari, Faridpur in the post of third teacher with a salary of 25 rupees.

in 1885 Jaladhar married Smt. Sukumary Debi, daughter of Ambia Charan Mitra of Nadia and greta great grand daughter of Raghu Nandan Mitra, Dewan of Maharaja Krishna Chandra of Nadia.

After a few years Jaladhar suffered the greatest loss in his life. During this time his mother, wife and daughter died in a quick succession. In 1887 his new born daughter died on the twelfth day of her birth. His wife also died in another twelve days. Within three months he lost his mother. Unable to bear with the grief, Jaladhar left for Himalayas and became a Paribrajak Sadhu (traveler-saint). In 1891 he came back from Himalayas and joined as a teacher in Mahishadal Raj School. He remarried Smt. Haridasi Debi of Datta family of Usti in 1893. In 1899 he left teaching job and shifted to Calcutta to explore a new profession - journalism.

Profession

Jaladhar joined বঙ্গবাসী (Bangabasi -  a weekly news paper) as an editorial help. Then he joined হিতবাদী (Hitabadi - a weekly news paper) as an editor and continued till 1907. He left Calcutta for a brief period and worked in the estate of Zamindar of Santosh in Tangail, Bangladesh firstly as a home tutor, and then as manager (দেওয়ান). Here he had written his travelogue to Himalayas. In 1911 he came back to Calcutta and joined a Government funded Bengali daily সুলভ সমাচার (Sulabh Samachar) as editor. In 1913 he joined in মাসিক ভারতবর্ষ (Masik Bharatbarsha - a monthly published bengaly compilation) as editor along with Amulyacharan Bidyabhushan which was published from the house of Gurudas Chattopadhyay in Cornwallis Street, and continued for next 26 years till he breathed his last. He was also associated as editor with news papers গ্রামবার্তা প্রকাশিকা (Grambarta Prakashija) and বসুমতী (Basumati).

Literary creation
Jaladhar Sen wrote about 42 books, including novels, travelogues, social messages, books for children and biographies. Story books - নৈবেদ্য (Naibedyo), কাঙালের ঠাকুর (Kangaler Thakur), বড় মানুষ (Baro Manush) etc.; Novels - দুঃখিনী (Dukkhini) (1909), অভাগী (Aubhagi) (3 parts, 1915–32), উৎস (Utsa) (1932) etc.; Travelogue - প্রবাস-চিত্র (Prabas Chitra) (1899) and হিমালয় (Himalaya) (1900); Children's literature - সীতাদেবী (Sita debi), কিশোর (Kisgore), শিব সীমন্তিনী (Shib Simantini), মায়ের পূজা (Mayer Puja), আফ্রিকায় সিংহ শিকার (Afrikay Singha Shikar), রামচন্দ্র (Ramchandra), আইসক্রিম সন্দেশ (Ice cream Sondesh) etc.; and Biography - কাঙাল হরিনাথ (Kangal Harinath) (2 parts, 1913, 1914), are worth to be mentioned. Kangal Harinath was the biography of Sri Harinath Majumdar, editor of Grambarta Prakashika, who was his teacher in the Goalanda School, and a philosopher and a guide to Jaladhar Sen. He also edited many books.

His travelogue titled "হিমালয়" (Himalaya) was an account of his perilous journey to Himalayas, which appeared in Bengali literary periodical "ভারতী" (Bharati) in installments during a span of about two years in 1903-04 while Smt Sarala Debi was the editor. It became extremely popular and sensitized Bengali society. Later it was published as a book in 1916 from Calcutta. This book, later, was included in the list of text books for Calcutta University. "Himalaya" was one of the pioneering literary works written in Bengali in the genre of travelogue, with an account of travel to the Himalayas, and contemporary to "Himaranya" written by Swami Ramananda Bharati describing his experience of travel to Kailsh and Manas Sarovar, published during 1901–02 in the Bengali literary magazine সাহিত্য "Sahitya", and followed by several noted Bengali travelogues writers in later years, such as  Uma Prasad Mukhopadhyay, Shanku Maharaj etc. to popularize travel and expedition to Himalayas in Bengali society and psyche.

Acquaintances, friends and personalities

 Lalan Fakir (Lalan Shah)
Jaladhar's was acquainted with Lalan Shah (or Lalan Fakir) through his mentor Kangal Harinath (Harinath Majumdar). In his memoirs he wrote: 

Kangal Harinath and Phikir Chand Fakir Movement
Harinath Majumdar alias Kangal Harinath was a close acquaintance to Haladhar Sen, father of Jaladar. Harinath had remarkable influence in Jaladhar's life, starting from the moment of his birth, when Harinath attributed the name Jaladhar to him. During 1880s, when Harinath was editing and publishing "Grambarta" from his residence at Kumarkhali village, many young men were attracted to him and a social group was formed. During this time Akshay Kumar Maitreya proposed formation of a performing artists' forum (বাউলের দল) with Jaladhar and other close friends to compose and perform "Baul" songs, a form of folk music of Bengal. Akshay Kumar Maitreya, Prafulla Chandra Gangopadhyay with his brother Banwarilal and cousin brother Nagendranath, Jaladhar Sen himself and many others under the patronage of Harinath formed this group. Collectively they created many Baul songs and used a common pseudonym ফিকির চাঁদ ফকির (Phikir Chand Fakir), used in the last stanza of most of the songs. Soon the group became very popular and a devotional movement was observed to be sweeping in many places far and near. This group was most probably the first of its kind in Bengal which is known as Band in the present day. Some of the early creations of Baul song by this group are noted under: 

Dwijendralal Ray
In the year 1878 Jaladhar appeared in the Entrance examination, and for that purpose he had to travel to Krishna Nagar, the district headquarters, from his village Kumarkhali. His elder brother could managed to gather only four rupees for the purpose for his trip. Jaladhar had only a "Dhuti and Chador" as his dress, did neither have a shirt nor shoes. After a short rail journey, he had to walk down to Krishna Nagar from Bogula in the last leg of the journey. There on the day of examination he met Dwijendralal Ray, who also appeared the examination in the same year. The remarkable event that led to a long and deep friendship between the two was described by jaladhar in his own words in his memoirs:  

Dwijendralal went to England for higher studies, and after return joined the government service, while Jaladhar continued as a school teacher. They met again during 1895–96 in Mahishadol. Dwijendralal was posted in Tamluk as the Settlement Officer and Jaladhar was the school teacher of Mahishadol that time. In later days when both of them were in Calcutta, in many occasions Dwijwendralal used to say:   

In 1913 Dwijendralal initiated publication of a Literary magazine in Bengali, (Bharat Barsha) as an editor. Unfortunately, he died unexpectedly on 17 May 1913, and Jaladhar Sen was appointed as the editor along with Amulya Charan Bidya Bhushan in the first year. After a year Amulya Charan left and Upendra Krishna Bandyopadhyay joined as co-editor. In the third year Upendra too left. Jaladhar continued as the editor of (Masik Bharat Barsha) for twenty two years.

Swami Vivekananda
Jaladhar Sen mentioned in the memoir আত্মজীবনী ও স্মৃতি—তর্পণ about his chanced meeting with Swami Vivekananda during his wandering days at Himalayas: 

Rajanikanta Sen
Rajanikanta Sen was very close to Jaladhar Sen. One of such many incidences was cited by Jaladhar Sen himself:  The song was "মায়ের দেওয়া মোটা কাপড় মাথায় তুলে নে রে ভাই" (Mayer deoa mota kapor mathay tule ne re bhai).

Surendranath Roy
When Surendranath Roy died, Jaladhar Sen, Editor of Bharatbarsha, wrote to Manindranath, son of Surendranath, a letter of condolence https://independentindian.com/2009/02/23/jaladhar-sen-writes-to-manindranath-at-surendranaths-death-c-nov-dec-1929/

Awards and recognition
Jaladhar Sen was awarded with a title of রায় বাহাদুর (Ray Bahadur) by the British government in 1929 for his contribution to Bengali literature and social reform. However, he never suppressed his inclination and support to the Indian patriotic movement.
He was elected twice as the Vice President of the Bangiya Sahitya Parishad. 
In 1932 Jaladhar Sen was facilitated in a function held in Rammohan Library, presided over by Sarat Chandra Chattopadhyay

Bibliography
Sen, Jaladhar (1915). (Kabya-Granthabali) vol 1–3.
Sen, Jaladhar (1916). হিমালয় (Himalaya) (Bengali), Gurudas Chattopadhyay & Sons, Calcutta.
Sen, Jaladhar (1920). ষোল আনি (Sholo Aani),  Gurudas Chattopadhyay & Sons, Calcutta.
Sen Jaladhar (1920). আত্মজীবনী ও স্মৃতি-তর্পন (Atmo Jibani O Smriti Tarpan), Jiggasa Agencies Ltd. Calcutta 9.

References

Bengali male poets
Bengal Renaissance
Bengali writers
Indian independence activists from Bengal
1860 births
1939 deaths
Bengali Hindus
Bengali-language writers
20th-century Bengalis
19th-century Bengalis
Indian poets
Indian male poets
Bengali poets
19th-century Bengali poets
20th-century Indian poets
19th-century Indian poets
19th-century Indian writers
20th-century Indian writers
19th-century Indian male writers
20th-century Indian male writers
Writers from Kolkata
Indian philanthropists
Indian newspaper editors
Indian editors
Indian social workers
Educationists from India
People from Kushtia District